This is list of results that England have played from 1890 to 1899.

A standard points scoring system was only implemented from 1891 .

1890 
Scores and results list England's points tally first.

1891 
Scores and results list England's points tally first.

1892 
Scores and results list England's points tally first.

1893 
Scores and results list England's points tally first.

1894 
Scores and results list England's points tally first.

1895 
Scores and results list England's points tally first.

1896 
Scores and results list England's points tally first.

1897 
Scores and results list England's points tally first.

1898 
Scores and results list England's points tally first.

1899 
Scores and results list England's points tally first.

Year Box

Notes 

1890–99
1889–90 in English rugby union
1890–91 in English rugby union
1891–92 in English rugby union
1892–93 in English rugby union
1893–94 in English rugby union
1894–95 in English rugby union
1895–96 in English rugby union
1896–97 in English rugby union
1897–98 in English rugby union
1898–99 in English rugby union